The BT Digital Music Awards (DMA) was a British music award ceremony held annually for 10 years from 2002 to 2011 (with no ceremony in 2009). Music industry professionals nominated artists, venues and hardware into the Judge's Choice award categories. The rest of the awards were made up of People's Choice Awards, voted for by the public. The final awards were held at the Camden Roundhouse on 29 September 2011.

2002 Awards
The inaugural 2002 ceremony was known as the Interactive Music Awards, and was set up and sponsored by BT Openworld. The ceremony was held inside the BT Tower in London. The 2002 winners were:
Best Pop Artist: Darius
Best Rock/Indie Artist: Supergrass
Best Dance/Urban Artist: The Streets
Artist of the Year: Blue
Best Major Label: BMG
Best Independent Label: Ninja Tune
Best Promotional Campaign: EMI:Chrysalis for Pink Floyd
Best Use of Broadband: Playlouder @ Glastonbury 2002
Best Innovation: Shazam
Best Shop: Groovetech
People's Choice Award: www.westlife.com

2003 Awards
The 2003 winners of the Interactive Music Awards were:
Best Pop Artist: Abs
Best Rock/Indie Artist: Muse
Best Dance/Urban Artist: Sasha
Best Promotional Campaign: Robbie Williams
Best Use of Mobile: Dizzee Rascal (Boy in Da Corner)
Best Use of Broadband: Ministry of Sound
Best Innovation: iTV Videos for Hell Is For Heroes & Robbie Williams
The Amused & Bemused Award: Simple Kid for the Simple Kid website
Best Music DVD: U2 (The *Best Of, 1990–2000)
Best Radio Station Online: Virgin Radio
Best Interactive TV Programme: TRL (MTV)
Best Music Video Online: Feeder (Just The Way I'm Feeling)
Best Web-based Music Game: Project Rockstar v2 game
Artist of the Year: Will Young
Best Official website: Westlife
Best Unofficial site: Radiohead fansite: www.ateaseweb.com

2004 Awards
In 2004 the ceremony was renamed to the Digital Music Awards. The 2004 award winners were:
Best Pop Artist: Girls Aloud
Best Rock Indie Artist: Paul Weller
Best Dance Artist: Faithless
Best Urban Artist: Lemar
Artist of the Year: Will Young
Best Music Video: The Streets (Blinded by the Lights)
Best Web-based Music Game: Muse Space Fighter game
Best Radio Station Online: Virgin Radio
Best Download Music Service: iTunes
Best Artist Download: Coldplay (2000 Miles)
Best unofficial music website: Madonnalicious
Best official music website: Westlife
Best Use of Mobile: Orange Fireplayer
Best Use of Broadband: Video-C Broadband Chart
Best Digital Promotional Campaign: Kasabian
Best Innovation: LAUNCHcast and Yahoo! Messenger integration

2005 Awards
The 2005 award winners included:
Best pop artist: James Blunt
Best rock artist: Stereophonics
Best urban artist: Goldie Lookin Chain
Favourite download single: U2's Vertigo
Soundtrack of 2005: The Magic Numbers' Love Me Like You
Best innovation: Napster To Go
Best radio station: BBC 6 Music
Best official site: Coldplay
Best digital music community: Coldplay
Best digital marketing campaign EMI (for Coldplay's X&Y album)
Best online band: Gorillaz
Best digital music store: iTunes

2006 Awards
The 2006 award winners included:
Best Pop Artist: Lily Allen
Best Rock Artist: Muse
Best Unofficial Music Site: Muse
Best Use of Mobile: Thom Yorke
Best Artist Campaign: Thom Yorke
Best Urban Artist: Lemar
Best Blog: Mike Skinner
Best Artist Promotion: The White Stripes
Pioneer Award: Peter Gabriel

2007 Awards
The 2007 award winners included:
Best pop artist: Natasha Bedingfield
Best band: Muse
Best urban act: Lemar
Best electronic artist: The Chemical Brothers
Best radio station: BBC 6 Music
Artist of the year: Funeral for a Friend
Best mobile campaign: Ludacris
Best official music website: Keane

2008 Awards
The 2008 award winners included:
Best pop artist: Kylie Minogue
Best innovation: Kylie Minogue (for the Kylie Konnect site)
Artist of the year: Radiohead
Best rock/indie artist: Coldplay
Best official music website: Coldplay
Best urban artist: Wiley
Best video podcast: The Zutons
Best breakthrough artist: Vampire Weekend

2009 Awards
There was no award ceremony in 2009.

2010 Awards
The 2010 award winners were:
Best Male: Robbie Williams
Best Female: Cheryl Cole
Best Group: JLS
Best Song: Cheryl Cole (Fight For This Love)
Best Video: JLS
Artist of the Year: Gorillaz
Best Artist Promotion: Gorillaz
Breakthrough Artist: Professor Green
Best Newcomer: Tinie Tempah
Best Independent Artist: Dizzee Rascal
Best International Artist: Lady Gaga
Best Blog: Music Fix
Best Official Site: Muse
Best Fan Site: Muselive.com
Best Event: Nokia presents Rihanna Live
Best Place to Discover Music: BBC Introducing
Best Radio Show or Podcast: Buxton's Big Mixtape show and podcast

2011 Awards
The 2011 award winners were:
Best male artist: Olly Murs
Best female artist: Jessie J
Best group: JLS
Best international artist or group: Bruno Mars
Best independent artist or group: Adele
Best newcomer: Jessie J
Best song: Jessie J ft B.o.B (Price Tag)
Best video: JLS with Tinie Tempah (Eyes Wide Shut)
Best Official Site: Coldplay
Best Fan Site: Coldplaying.com
Best place to discover music: Radio 1 online
Best place to hear music: YouTube
Best place to buy music: iTunes

References

External links
 www.btdma.com

BT Digital Music Awards